Dälek (stylized in all lowercase) is an American experimental hip hop group formed in Newark, New Jersey in 1998. The group's current lineup consists of MC dälek (vocals and producer) and Mike Manteca  (aka Mike Mare) (electronics and producer).

History
The group originated in the New Jersey DIY scene of the mid-1990s, based around a studio lineup of Dälek (Will Brooks), Oktopus (Alap Momin), and Joshua Booth. Brooks had won a scholarship at college, used it to buy an MPC3000 and dropped out to become a full-time musician and formed Dälek with Momin, who encouraged him to name the group after his stage name "like Van Halen". 

The group recorded and played live with several DJs, including DJ rEk on from 1998 to 2002, from 2002 and 2005 with still (Hsi-Chang Lin), and from 2006 to 2009 with Motiv. With this core, the group released four full-length LPs on Ipecac Recordings, and a string of EPs, singles and remixes on various independent labels.

Booth left the group to complete his doctorate in 2009, and Oktopus had relocated to Berlin by 2010. Dälek released a single LP, Untitled, with Brooks and Momin as the sole members, in 2011. From 2011 to 2015, the group was on permanent hiatus.

In 2015, Brooks reunited with DJ rEk and Dälek collaborator Mike Manteca (Destructo Swarmbots). In 2016, the group released a full-length LP Asphalt for Eden on Profound Lore Records.

In December 2016, Ipecac Recordings announced that they had re-signed Dälek. The group released Endangered Philosophies in August 2017. Spyros Stasis of PopMatters described it as an 'enticing and alluring' mix of 'hip-hop, krautrock, noise and shoegaze'. Paul Simpson of AllMusic found it 'equally abrasive and hypnotic' and 'bracing yet beautiful'.

In 2019 the group release Respect To The Authors, a six-track EP released on vinyl through Exile on Mainstream. The EP was re-released digitally in 2020. 

In 2020, during the Covid-19 Pandemic, the group were unable to access their Union City studio and ultimately scrapped the album they had under production. As an outlet, DJ Dalek produced the Meditations series of seven download-only albums from his home.

The group reconvened with Booth in 2021 and began work on Precipice, a ten track album, which was released digitally and on vinyl in April 2022. The album includes a collaboration with Adam Jones, guitarist with Tool. 

Dälek have often shared the stage with artists covering a wide range of genres, such as Godflesh, Isis, Prince Paul, Melvins, Tool, De La Soul, RJD2, The Young Gods, Meat Beat Manifesto, Jesu, The Pharcyde, Grandmaster Flash, KRS-One, Dub Trio, Charles Hayward, Cult of Luna, Zu, Blackie, The Gaslamp Killer, Earth, The Dillinger Escape Plan, The Bug, Mastodon, and Lovage. Oktopus and MC dälek collaborated with experimental metal/hardcore punk band Starkweather on their 2010 album This Sheltering Night.

Style and influence
Dälek's music is dark, noisy and atmospheric, equally inspired by industrial music like Einstürzende Neubauten, the layered noise of My Bloody Valentine and the dense sound collages of Public Enemy. Their sound is often constructed through sampling and a musical base atypical of most hip hop, making it difficult for people to classify their sound. They have been described as trip hop, glitch hop, metal, shoegaze, and hip hop, as well as being criticized for their broad range of sound.

MC dälek described the duo's music to the Chicago Sun-Times:

Discography

Dälek Albums, EPs and Singles
Negro Necro Nekros (1998)
From Filthy Tongue of Gods and Griots (2002)
Dälek vs. Dälek (2002) - Single 
Absence (2005)
Streets All Amped (2006)
Deadverse Massive Vol. 1 Rarities 1999–2006 (2007)
Abandoned Language (2007)
Gutter Tactics (2009)
Untitled (2010)
Asphalt for Eden (2016)
Molten (2016) - download-only song 
Endangered Philosophies (2017)
Respect To The Authors (2019) - six song, vinyl only EP
Decimation (Dis Nation) (2022) - Single
Precipice (2022)

Collaborations
Megaton/Classic Homicide (2000) split collaboration with Techno Animal
Ruin It (2002) in collaboration with Kid606
Dälek vs. Velma (2003) split collaboration with Velma
Derbe Respect, Alder (2004) in collaboration with Faust
Dälek vs. Zu (2005) - two track remix single with Zu
Deadverse Massive (2007) - four track 12" in collaboration with Destructo Swarmbots and Oddateee
My Education vs. dälek (2007) in collaboration with My Education 
Dälek vs. Ifwhen – Hear Less / No Good Trying (2008) - four song 12" with Ifwhen.
DJ Baku vs. Dälek (2009) - two exclusive Dälek tracks and a remix of a Dälek song by DJ Baku, and vice versa. 
Griots And Gods – Les Eurockeennes Festival Belfort 2010 (2010) Live collaboration with The Young Gods.  
Anguish - self-titled LP and CD (2019) - 9 track album in collaboration with Hans Joachim Irmler of Faust and saxophonist Mats Gustafsson and drummer Andreas Werliin of Fire! Orchestra

References

External links

Dälek at Ipecac Recordings
Pizza joint recording session with 'They Shoot Music – Don't They' (04/09)

American hip hop groups
Hip hop duos
Musical groups from New Jersey
Alternative hip hop groups
American shoegaze musical groups
Noise musical groups
American ambient music groups
Musical groups established in 1998
American experimental musical groups
American industrial music groups
Ipecac Recordings artists
Profound Lore Records artists